Leiston Jane Pickett (born 8 February 1992) is an Australian Commonwealth Games gold medalist swimmer. A participant in the 2010 Commonwealth Games, Pickett won the 50-metre breaststroke ahead of fellow Australian Leisel Jones. She attended A.B. Paterson College and graduated in 2009.

References

External links
 
  (archive)
 
 
 
 
 

1992 births
Australian female breaststroke swimmers
Commercial Swimming Club swimmers
Commonwealth Games bronze medallists for Australia
Commonwealth Games gold medallists for Australia
Commonwealth Games medallists in swimming
Living people
Medalists at the FINA World Swimming Championships (25 m)
Olympic swimmers of Australia
Sportswomen from Queensland
Sportspeople from the Gold Coast, Queensland
Swimmers at the 2010 Commonwealth Games
Swimmers at the 2012 Summer Olympics
Swimmers at the 2014 Commonwealth Games
Swimmers at the 2018 Commonwealth Games
Universiade medalists in swimming
Universiade silver medalists for Australia
Medalists at the 2017 Summer Universiade
20th-century Australian women
21st-century Australian women
Medallists at the 2010 Commonwealth Games
Medallists at the 2014 Commonwealth Games
Medallists at the 2018 Commonwealth Games